Marcel Izrailevich Rosenberg (1896 — 5 March 1938) was a Soviet diplomat. 

Rosenberg was born into the family of a Jewish trader who in 1906 emigrated from Poland with his family to Königsberg in Prussia and later to Berlin. Rosenberg was the first Soviet ambassador to Spain, he served during the Spanish Civil War. Recalled to the Soviet Union in 1937, he was soon executed during the Great Purge. He was succeeded in office by Leon Gaikis, who faced a similar fate.

References

External links
Soviet Diplomacy and the Spanish Civil War

1896 births
1938 deaths
Ambassadors of the Soviet Union to Spain
Communist Party of the Soviet Union members
Soviet people of the Spanish Civil War
Jews from the Russian Empire
19th-century Polish Jews
Soviet Jews
Diplomats from Warsaw
People from Warsaw Governorate
Permanent Representatives to the League of Nations
Soviet people of Polish-Jewish descent
Great Purge victims from Poland
Executed people from Masovian Voivodeship
Jews executed by the Soviet Union
Jewish socialists